The following is a table of parks in Lincoln, Nebraska.  All of the properties listed are maintained by Lincoln Parks & Recreation.

External links
Lincoln Parks & Recreation website

Geography of Lincoln, Nebraska
Lincoln
Nebraska-related lists
Lincoln